Lance L. Smith (born September 18, 1946) is a retired United States Air Force general who last served as the Commander, U.S. Joint Forces Command, Norfolk, Virginia, and NATO Supreme Allied Commander for Transformation from November 10, 2005, to November 9, 2007. A highly decorated combat veteran, the general retired from active duty on January 1, 2008.

Smith entered the United States Air Force in 1970 after graduating from Virginia Tech and completing Officer Training School. He served two tours at The Pentagon and was Commandant of the NATO School at Supreme Headquarters Allied Powers Europe, Commandant of Air War College, and Vice Commander of Air University. He commanded two fighter wings and led two air expeditionary force deployments to Southwest Asia: AEF III and the 4th Air Expeditionary Wing. He flew more than 165 combat missions in Southeast and Southwest Asia in the A-1 Skyraider and the F-15E Strike Eagle. A command pilot, he has more than 3,000 hours in various military aircraft.

Education
1969 Bachelor of Arts degree in business management, Virginia Polytechnic Institute, Blacksburg, Virginia
1978 Master of Arts degree in business management, Central Michigan University, Mount Pleasant
1982 Air Command and Staff College, Maxwell Air Force Base, Alabama
1990 Army War College, Carlisle Barracks, Pennsylvania
1994 Advanced Executive Program, J.L. Kellogg Graduate School of Management, Northwestern University, Evanston, Illinois

Assignments
June 1970 - June 1971, student, undergraduate pilot training, Columbus AFB, Mississippi
June 1971 - September 1971, A-1 combat crew training, Hurlburt Field, Florida
October 1971 - October 1972, A-1 pilot, 1st Special Operations Squadron, Nakhon Phanom Royal Thai AFB, Thailand
October 1972 - July 1973, instructor pilot training, Randolph AFB, Texas
July 1973 - September 1977, instructor pilot and chief, check section, 96th Flying Training Squadron, Williams AFB, Arizona
September 1977 - January 1979, staff officer, Air Staff Training Program, Deputy Chief of Staff for Personnel, the Pentagon, Washington, D.C.
January 1979 - August 1981, student, A-7 Corsair conversion training, A-7D aircraft commander, flight commander and assistant operations officer, 76th Tactical Fighter Squadron, England AFB, Louisiana
August 1981 - June 1982, student, Air Command and Staff College, Maxwell AFB, Alabama
June 1982 - July 1986, Air Staff officer, Deputy Chief of Staff for Plans and Operations; Project Checkmate analyst for interdiction, Europe and Southwest Asia; Air Force team chief, Joint Assessment and Initiative Office, and executive officer to the Air Force Director of Operations, the Pentagon, Washington, D.C.
July 1986 - July 1989, Chief of Safety, later, Assistant Deputy Commander for Operations, 354th Tactical Fighter Wing, Myrtle Beach AFB, South Carolina
July 1989 - June 1990, student, Army War College, Carlisle Barracks, Pennsylvania
June 1990 - August 1992, Commandant, NATO School, SHAPE, Oberammergau, Germany
August 1992 - September 1993, Vice Commander, later, Commander, 27th Fighter Wing, Cannon AFB, New Mexico
September 1993 - June 1995, Assistant Director of Operations, Headquarters Air Combat Command, Langley AFB, Virginia
June 1995 - July 1997, Commander, 4th Fighter Wing, Seymour Johnson AFB, North Carolina
July 1997 - August 1998, Vice Commander, 7th Air Force and U.S. Air Forces Korea, and Chief of Staff, Combined Republic of Korea and U.S. Air Component Command, Osan Air Base, South Korea
September 1998 - December 1999, Commandant, Air War College, and Vice Commander, Air University, Maxwell AFB, Alabama
December 1999 - November 2001, Commander, Air Force Doctrine Center, Maxwell AFB, Alabama
November 2001 - October 2003, Deputy Commander, United Nations Command; Deputy Commander, U.S. Forces Korea; Commander, Air Component Command, Republic of Korea and U.S. Combined Forces Command; and Commander, 7th Air Force, Pacific Air Forces, Osan AB, South Korea
October 2003 - November 2005, Deputy Commander, U.S. Central Command, MacDill AFB, Florida
November 2005 - November 2007, Commander, U.S. Joint Forces Command, and NATO Supreme Allied Commander for Transformation, Norfolk, Virginia

Flight information
Rating: Command pilot
Flight hours: More than 3,000
Aircraft flown: T-33, T-37, T-38, A-1, A-7, A-10, F-111F, F-15E and F-16

Major awards and decorations

Effective dates of promotion
Second Lieutenant May 18, 1970
First Lieutenant November 11, 1971
Captain October 18, 1973
Major December 4, 1978
Lieutenant Colonel February 1, 1982
Colonel July 1, 1989
Brigadier General July 1, 1995
Major General April 1, 1998
Lieutenant General January 1, 2002
General November 7, 2005

References

External links

General Lance L. Smith's Official DoD Bio
U.S. Joint Forces Command Biography

1946 births
Living people
People from Akron, Ohio
United States Air Force generals
United States Air Force personnel of the Vietnam War
Recipients of the Silver Star
Recipients of the Legion of Merit
Recipients of the Distinguished Flying Cross (United States)
Recipients of the Meritorious Service Decoration
Recipients of the Defense Superior Service Medal
Recipients of the Defense Distinguished Service Medal
Recipients of the Air Force Distinguished Service Medal
Recipients of the Air Medal
Order of National Security Merit members
Recipients of the NATO Meritorious Service Medal
Recipients of the Badge of Honour of the Bundeswehr
Virginia Tech alumni
United States Army War College alumni
Recipients of the Humanitarian Service Medal